Minnesota Paper Form Board Test is said to test “imagery capacity” 
, “spatial visualization”,“mental visualization
skills”   “part–whole relationship skills”  and “the ability of an
individual to visualize and manipulate objects in space”. The test consists of five figures and one of the figures displayed in disarranged parts. The subject has to decide which of the figures displays the pieces joined together.

References

External links
Revised Minnesota Paper Form Board Test instructions and sample problems can be found in Appendix D (page 107) of
 http://repository.lib.ncsu.edu/ir/bitstream/1840.16/4379/1/etd.pdf
Short descriptions:
 http://www.jdentaled.org/cgi/reprint/65/9/874.pdf
 https://books.google.com/books?id=VNPhIyZFmkAC&pg=PA236&lpg=PA236&dq=%22Minnesota+Paper+Form+Board%22+diagram&source=bl&ots=WmEPOllf0b&sig=Gqk755WetnFUhFI_-IVqE3ewpVA&hl=en&ei=yky2SvCbEOWrjAeU492vDA&sa=X&oi=book_result&ct=result&resnum=2#v=onepage&q=%22Minnesota%20Paper%20Form%20Board%22%20diagram&f=false
Inessential information around the test:
 

Cognitive tests
Vision